The 2005 Centrix Financial Grand Prix of Denver was the ninth round of the 2005 Bridgestone Presents the Champ Car World Series Powered by Ford season, held on August 14, 2005 on the streets of Denver, Colorado near the Pepsi Center.  Paul Tracy sat on the pole and Sébastien Bourdais won the race.

Qualifying results

Race

Caution flags

Notes

 New Track Record Paul Tracy 59.432 (Qualification Session #2)
 New Race Lap Record Sébastien Bourdais 1:00.574
 New Race Record Sébastien Bourdais 1:49:45.135
 Average Speed 87.868 mph

Championship standings after the race

Drivers' Championship standings

 Note: Only the top five positions are included.

References

External links
 Full Weekend Times & Results
 Friday Qualifying Results
 Saturday Qualifying Results
 Race Box Score

Denver
Centrix Financial Grand Prix of Denver
Centrix Financial Grand Prix of Denver